The Australian cricket team toured Pakistan in February to March 1980 to play a three-match Test series against Pakistan. Pakistan won the test series 1-0.

The Series was Javed Miandad's first as a captain, following the retirement of Asif Iqbal. Pakistan were heavily criticised by analysts for producing doctored featherbed after their win in first test at Karachi largely to neutralize the effect of Dennis Lillee who was at height of his bowling powers and was best fast bowler in world cricket. In second test at Faisalabad, only two innings were possible (Second Innings weren't completed either). During the same test first time in their cricket history all 11 Australian players bowled a delivery in a test match.

Background
There was some original doubt as to whether the tour would go ahead due to financial problems. Eventually the tour guarantee was increased and the number of games played cut from eight matches to five with three test matches and two 3-day games.

Australian squad
It was the first tour by an Australian team since the peace treaty between the Australian Cricket Board and World Series Cricket. The original squad selected was as follows:
Batsmen - Greg Chappell (captain), Kim Hughes (vice-captain), Allan Border, Graham Yallop, Bruce Laird, Julien Wiener, David Hookes
Fast bowlers - Dennis Lillee, Geoff Dymock, Mick Malone, Geoff Lawson
Spinners - Graeme Beard, Ray Bright
Wicketkeeper - Rod Marsh

Tour Matches

Test series summary

First Test

Second Test

Third Test

Impact
The tour was Javed Miandad's first series win as test captain of Pakistan. It was a notable personal success for Allan Border who scored over 600 runs, and a disappointment for David Hookes, who only scored 10 runs for the whole tour.

References

External links
Australia in Pakistan, 1979-80 at Cricinfo
Australian cricket team in Pakistan in 1979-80  at CricketArchive

1980 in Australian cricket
1980 in Pakistani cricket
1979-80
International cricket competitions from 1975–76 to 1980
Pakistani cricket seasons from 1970–71 to 1999–2000